Paris, Lisboa is the second studio album by the Portuguese singer Salvador Sobral. It was released in Portugal on 29 March 2019 by Edições Valentim de Carvalho. The album peaked at number 1 on the Portuguese Albums Chart, the album also peaked at number 11 on the Spanish Albums Chart. The album includes the singles "Mano a Mano", "Cerca del Mar" and "Anda Estragar-me os Planos".

Background
He sings four languages on the album. In an interview he spoke of his successful heart transplant operation and how it encouraged him to begin working on his second studio album, he said, "I’m here after all, this will continue. If everything goes well it’s better to start thinking of a new record!"

Singles
"Mano a Mano" was released as the lead single from the album on 11 May 2018. The song peaked at number 84 on the Portuguese Singles Chart. On 12 May 2018 he performed the song live at the final of the Eurovision Song Contest 2018 with Caetano Veloso. "Cerca del Mar" was released as the second single from the album on 6 July 2018. "Anda Estragar-me os Planos" was released as the third single from the album on 8 March 2019.

Track listing

Charts

Release history

References

2019 albums
Salvador Sobral albums